Basore is an unincorporated community on Upper Cove Run in Hardy County, West Virginia, United States. Basore lies to the east of Mathias at the eastern approach of a gap in Cove Mountain.

Historic sites 
Basore Schoolhouse

References

Unincorporated communities in Hardy County, West Virginia
Unincorporated communities in West Virginia